Events in the year 1902 in India.

Incumbents
 Emperor of India – Edward VII
 Viceroy of India – George Curzon, 1st Marquess Curzon of Kedleston

Events
 National income - 8,283 million
 United Provinces of Agra and Oudh is established (exists until 1947)
 Anushilan Samiti established

Law

Births
10 October – K. Shivaram Karanth, writer, social activist, environmentalist, Yakshagana artist, movie maker and thinker (died 1997).

Deaths
4 July – Swami Vivekananda, chief disciple of Ramakrishna and founder of Ramakrishna Mission (born 1863).

References

 
India
Years of the 20th century in India